George Elmer Crable (1885–1965) was a pitcher in Major League Baseball. He pitched in two games for the 1910 Brooklyn Superbas.

Crable played in the minor leagues from 1908 to 1918, compiling a career record of 83–104.

References

1885 births
1965 deaths
Baseball players from Nebraska
People from Kearney, Nebraska
Major League Baseball pitchers
Brooklyn Superbas players
Austin Senators players
Galveston Sand Crabs players
Waco Navigators players
Savannah Indians players
Atlanta Crackers players
Fort Worth Panthers players
San Antonio Bronchos players
Richmond Climbers players
Toronto Maple Leafs (International League) players